Lesia Tsurenko was the defending champion and successfully defended her title, defeating Stefanie Vögele in the final, 5–7, 7–6(7–2), 6–2.

Seeds

Draw

Finals

Top half

Bottom half

Qualifying

Seeds

Qualifiers

Draw

First qualifier

Second qualifier

Third qualifier

Fourth qualifier

Fifth qualifier

Sixth qualifier

EXternal links
 Main draw
 Qualifying draw

2018 Abierto Mexicano Telcel
Abierto Mexicano Telcel - Women's Singles